Anglo-Mughal War (1686–1690) was a war fought between Mughal Empire and British East India Company in the late 17th century. 

Anglo-Mughal War may also refer to:
Bengal War (1757–1765)
Carnatic Wars (1744–1763)
Indian rebellion (1857)